Bassel Khaiat (Arabic: باسل خياط, born 29 August, 1977 in Damascus, Syria) is a Syrian actor, working in theatre, television, and film.

Early life 
Khaiat was born in Damascus, Syria, and has a brother named Mohammed. Khaiat started acting at eight years old. He applied for admission at the Higher Institute of Dramatic Arts, but was rejected. He reapplied the following year, was accepted, and graduated in 1999, the same year as Kosai Khauli and Sulafa Memar.

He was an athletic child and grew up in a supportive environment for the arts. His father was a big fan of the movies and his mother came from a musical family.

Khaiat had a difficult upbringing, forcing him to work from a young age. He has described the death of his father as one of the most difficult experiences he has had to endure.

Career 
Khaiat has acted in France, Egypt, Beirut, Jordan, Kuwait and Syria. He is part of a group of Syrian actors who dominate Arab television series, along with Khauli, Taim Hasan, and Maxim Khalil, forming a regional rat pack.

Khaiat's entry into television was a Syrian television show in 1992, Once Upon a Time. In 2000, his portrayal of Amer in the show Secrets of the City, by Hisham Sharbatji, won over audiences. He received critical acclaim in 2004 for his role in the series Big Dreams, by Hatem Ali, followed by successful television series, such as prominent Syrian shows Spring of Cordoba, On the Brink, Abu Khalil Al-Qabbani, and Women's Love.

In 2004, he was featured in the movie The Gate of Sun, which was shown at the Cannes Film Festival.

He broke into Egyptian television through his series Niran Siddiq, broadcast during Ramadan, in which he portrayed Muammar Gaddafi. He attracted Egyptian audiences and directors through his portrayal of psychologically complex roles in other Ramadan series My Way alongside famed singer Sherine, who is he is a fan of, Al-Mezan, 30 Days, and The Journey.

In 2018, he was featured in Tango, broadcast internationally on Netflix. The same year, he won a Distinctive International Arab Festivals Award for his work.

In 2019, he served as a judge for the Sharjah International Film Festival for Children.

In 2021, as part of MBC's 30th anniversary celebration, Khaiat and other superstars from the Arab world such as Yousra, Nasser Al Qasabi, Amina Khalil, Dhaffer L'Abidine, Asser Yassin, and Somaya El Khashab, appeared in a four-segment episode of Who Wants to Be a Millionaire. He was profiled in GQ magazine by Nasri Atallah in 2021.

Personal life 
Khaiat was engaged for over two years to Tunisian artist Hend Sabry.

In 2020, he, along with many Syrian actors, was embroiled with the Syrian Artists Syndicate, after the president, actor Zuhair Ramadan, made several remarks stating that some actors had called for killing of the Syrian people. Khaiat issued a statement that his dismissal from the Syndicate was because of statements made without evidence, that he would reschedule payments to the Syndicate, and that artists have the right to know what they are paying for and what they will get in return.

He is married to Nahed Zaidan, with whom he has a son, Shams, and a daughter, Isabelle. His favorite actor is Daniel Day-Lewis.

References 

Syrian male television actors
Syrian male film actors
1977 births
People from Damascus
20th-century Syrian male actors
21st-century Syrian male actors
Higher Institute of Dramatic Arts (Damascus) alumni
Living people